Mimacraea is a genus of butterflies in the family Lycaenidae. The species of this genus are endemic to the Afrotropical realm. As the name suggests, Mimacraea species are mimics of species in the genus Acraea and related genera.

Species
Mimacraea abriana Libert & Collins, 2000
Mimacraea apicalis Grose-Smith & Kirby, 1889
Mimacraea charmian Grose-Smith & Kirby, 1889
Mimacraea costleyi Druce, 1912
Mimacraea darwinia Butler, 1872
Mimacraea febe Libert, 2000
Mimacraea fulvaria Aurivillius, 1895
Mimacraea gelinia (Oberthür, 1893)
Mimacraea krausei Dewitz, 1889
Mimacraea landbecki Druce, 1910
Mimacraea maesseni Libert, 2000
Mimacraea marginata Libert & Collins, 2000
Mimacraea marshalli Trimen, 1898
Mimacraea neavei Eltringham, 1909
Mimacraea neokoton Druce, 1907
Mimacraea neurata Holland, 1895
Mimacraea paragora Rebel, 1911
Mimacraea skoptoles Druce, 1907
Mimacraea telloides Schultze, 1923

References
Libert, M. (2000) Révision du genre Mimacraea Butler avec description de quatre nouvelles espèces et deux nouvelles sous-espèces. A.B.R.I., Nairobi and Lambillonea, Tervuren, May, 2000:1-72.

External links
Royal Africa Museum has quality images of  Mimacraea
"Mimacraea Butler, 1872" at Markku Savela's Lepidoptera and some other life forms
 Seitz, A. Die Gross-Schmetterlinge der Erde 13: Die Afrikanischen Tagfalter. Plate XIII 63

Poritiinae
Taxa named by Arthur Gardiner Butler
Lycaenidae genera